The Clothing & Textiles Research Journal is a peer-reviewed academic journal that publishes papers in the field of Social Sciences. The journal's editor is Youn-Kyung Lydia Kim, Department of Retail, Hospitality, and Tourism Management, University of Tennessee, Knoxville. It has been in publication since 1982 and is currently published by SAGE Publications in association with the International Textiles and Apparel Association.

Scope 
The Clothing & Textiles Research Journal aims to inspire further research in clothing and textiles, acting as a resource for scholars. The interdisciplinary journal publishes articles in areas such as aesthetics and design, consumer theories and behavior and historic and cultural aspects of dress.

Abstracting and indexing 
The Clothing & Textiles Research Journal  is abstracted and indexed in, among other databases:  SCOPUS, and the Social Sciences Citation Index. According to the Journal Citation Reports, its 2020 impact factor is 1.900, ranking it 59 out of 110 journals in the category ‘Social Sciences, Interdisciplinary’ and 131 out of 153 journals in the category ‘Business’.

References

External links 
 
 ITAA Official website

SAGE Publishing academic journals
English-language journals
Publications established in 1982
Quarterly journals